Council of the Republic may refer to:
 Council of the Republics of the Supreme Soviet of the Soviet Union
 Council of the Republic of Belarus
 Council of the Republic (Russia)
 Council of the Republic of France, the name for the Senate of France during the French Fourth Republic
 Council of the Republic (Catalonia), an organisation promoting Catalan independence
 Council of the Republic (Brazil)